Metal Militia may refer to:

 Metal Militia (band)
 "Metal Militia" (song), a song by Metallica on the album Kill 'Em All
 "Metal Militia", (Robot Chicken episode), an episode of the TV series Robot Chicken
 Metal Mulisha, a clothing brand